The Turner & Hooch franchise consists of American buddy cop-crime comedy-thrillers including three installments: one theatrical film, one television special continuation of that film, and one legacy sequel television series. The plot comedically revolves around schedule-regimented law enforcement officers, who are teamed-up with disorderly dogs during crime scene investigations.

Though the original film was met with a mixed response from critics, the film was a box office success and has since acquired recognition as a cult classic. The film is noteworthy, as the script cost The Walt Disney Company's Touchstone Pictures the most money at that point in time. The television continuation release was met with negative reception. The franchise continued with the Turner & Hooch television series in 2021. The show was met with mixed critical reception, with praise directed at Josh Peck's likability and its use of the canine actors, while criticism targeted its simplistic premise.

Film

Turner & Hooch (1989)

Organized, and orderly police detective Scott Turner attains ownership of a rambunctious French Mastiff named Hooch, when the latter's owner named Amos is murdered. As he tries to solve the mystery surrounding his friend's death, Turner begins to realize that Hooch was the only eyewitness to the crime. Over the course of their investigation, the pair form a bond and continue to follow leads. As they find the killer, presumed allies are revealed to be involved and guilty as well. Once confronted, a police shootout ensues with Hooch being shot and being critically injured. Despite this the dog takes a final stand and helps Turner apprehend the criminals. Turner rushes Hooch to his veterinarian girlfriend, though the animal appears to be beyond saving, and seemingly dies. The couple reluctantly returns home, fending for Hooch and Rachel's dog's puppies; one of which especially reminds them of their beloved companion and pet.

Disney's Turner & Hooch (1990)

Filmed as an intended pilot for a spin-off continuation of the original film, the failed-to-be-ordered series' first episode was released as a made-for-television movie, as a part of The Magical World of Walt Disney instead. Retconning the original film's ending, Hooch is revealed to have survived a near-death injury. The plot revolves around the continued investigations of the titular duo, while Scott Turner and his recent marriage with Emily.

Television

In December 2019 a streaming series exclusive adaptation for Disney+, originally announced as a "reboot" of the franchise, entered development. Matt Nix serves as creator, writer, showrunner, and executive producer. The project entered development under the 20th Century Fox banner, a subsidiary of The Walt Disney Company following the purchase of 21st Century Fox by the latter. By February 2020, the project was ordered to series with Josh Peck signed on as the star of the show. The plot revolves around US Marshall Scott Turner inheriting an unruly dog, that he intends to train to be his partner on the force, following the unexpected death of his father. The series is a joint-venture production between 20th Century Television, ABC Signature, and Ostrich Productions. In February 2021, it was revealed that the series will serve as a legacy sequel, with Peck's character being the son of the role portrayed by Tom Hanks in the original film. A combination of five French Mastiffs collectively portray Hooch. The first season of the series will consist of a total of 12 episodes.

The first episode of Turner & Hooch debuted on July 21, 2021, with subsequent episodes releasing weekly thereafter. The series was cancelled by December of the same year, though it was being shopped around to other networks and/or streaming services.

Main cast and characters

Notes

Additional crew and production details

Reception

Box office and financial performance

Critical and public response

References 

Turner & Hooch (franchise)
Touchstone Pictures franchises